SuperValu Pharmacies, Inc. is a wholly owned subsidiary of Eden Prairie, Minnesota-based SuperValu. SuperValu Pharmacy operates 950 pharmacies in Shop 'n Save, Hornbacher's, Farm Fresh Food & Pharmacy and Cub Foods stores.

Ownership
SuperValu Pharmacies is owned and operated by the American grocery retailer, SuperValu.

Operations
In 2008, the SuperValu Pharmacies completed company-wide deployment of an in house—developed pharmacy management system called "ARx", design of which began in 2004.

, the company operated in 25 US states under 10 brands, including:
 Acme Sav-On and Albertsons Sav-On Pharmacies
 Albertsons Osco, Shaw's Osco, Jewel-Osco and Shop & Save Osco Pharmacies
 Cub Pharmacy
 (New) Farm Fresh Pharmacy
 Shop & Save Pharmacy
 (New) Shoppers Pharmacy

Services
Services provided by locations owned by the company have included:
 annual in-store influenza vaccination, conducted by staff trained by the company in administration of the vaccine.
 occasional consultations for migraine sufferers to help identify triggers and how to avoid them.

Corporate governance
All members of the company's leadership team are pharmacists, according to a company spokesperson in 2014.  , the president of SuperValu Pharmacies was Chris Dimos.  , the company's director of clinical programs was Anthony Provenzano, who in 2012 was provided an interim appointment to the board of the Accreditation Council for Pharmacy Education.

References

SuperValu (United States)
Pharmacies of the United States
Companies based in Cook County, Illinois
American companies established in 1985
Retail companies established in 1985
Health care companies based in Illinois